Cooperite is a grey mineral consisting of platinum sulfide, generally in combinations with sulfides of other elements such as palladium and nickel (PdS and NiS). It is a dimorph of braggite.

It is mined as an ore of platinum and platinum group metals such as palladium.  It occurs in South Africa in minable quantities and an old mine near Mount Washington on Vancouver Island. 

It was first described in 1928 for occurrences in the Bushveld Igneous Complex and named after South African metallurgist Richard A. Cooper who first characterized it.

See also
List of minerals
List of minerals named after people

References

Webmineral data

Platinum minerals
Nickel minerals
Palladium minerals
Sulfide minerals
Tetragonal minerals
Minerals in space group 131
Minerals described in 1928